Ralph Eure may refer to:

Ralph Eure (died 1545), MP for Scarborough
Ralph Eure, 3rd Baron Eure (1558 – 1617)
Ralph Eure, 8th Baron Eure, Baron Eure (died 1690)
Ralph Euer, also known as Ralph Eure